Mehmed Skender (born 30 May 1959) is a former Bosnian weightlifter. He competed in the men's heavyweight II event at the 1992 Summer Olympics.

References

External links
 

1959 births
Living people
Bosnia and Herzegovina male weightlifters
Olympic weightlifters of Bosnia and Herzegovina
Weightlifters at the 1992 Summer Olympics
Place of birth missing (living people)